Sihem Bensedrine (born October 28, 1950) is a Tunisian journalist and human rights activist. In 2005, she was honored with the Oxfam Novib/PEN Award.

Biography
She was born in La Marsa, near Tunis and went to France to study at the University of Toulouse, where she earned a degree in philosophy.

In 1980, she became a reporter for the independent journal Le Phare. When the journal stopped publication, she became a political chief at Maghreb, and then at Réalités. When Maghreb ceased publication because of the food riots in 1983, she became the editor-in-chief of Gazette Touristique and founded l'Hebdo Touristique. At the same time, she was overseeing the opposition newspaper El Mawkif.

She founded the publishing house Arcs in 1988, but it became bankrupt in 1992 because of the human rights crisis. In 1998, she became literary chief for the publishing house Noir sur Blanc.

In 1998, she founded the Conseil National pour les Libertés en Tunisie (CNLT), of which she became the primary spokesperson.

From 1999, she and her businesses were subject to numerous police and judicial actions, including confiscation and destruction of property and a personal libel campaign in which she was portrayed as a prostitute, because of her freedom of the press and human rights activities.

In 2000, she co-founded the online journal Kalima with Naziha Réjiba.  In  2001, Réjiba and Bensedrine founded the group Observatoire de la Liberté de la Presse, de L'Edition et de la Création (OLPEC), which promotes freedom of the press.

on 17 June 2001, Bensedrine appeared on the  "Le Grand Maghreb", Al Mustaquilla television station, based in London. She was openly critical of corruption in Tunisia and its government. On 26 June 2001, she was arrested at the airport in Tunis Carthage following a television interview in which she denounced human rights abuses, including systematic use of torture and widespread judicial corruption. She was accused of spreading "false news with an aim towards disturbing public order", "defamation" and "undermining the judicial institution". There was much confusion as to whether she had been arrested or not as the standard Tunisian legal procedures had not been followed. It was later confirmed by members of Lawyers Without Borders that she had been arrested and proper legal procedures were then maintained.

On 10 July 2001, Bensedrine was awarded the "Special Award for Human Rights Journalism Under Threat" at the Amnesty International UK Media Awards. Her husband and daughter received the award on her behalf. On 12 August Bensedrine was released because of widespread support, both in Tunisia and abroad, particularly in France. Bensedrine's arrest was positively linked to her appearance on the Al Mustaquilla television station and her appearance of 17 June 2001 was cited by the Tunisian Government as evidence in a defamation case which they pursued against the Al Mustaquilla television station.

In 2004, Bensedrine was honored by Canadian Journalists for Free Expression with an International Press Freedom Award in recognition of her courage in defending and promoting press freedom.

In 2005, Bensedrine was honored with the Oxfam Novib/PEN Award.

In 2008, Bensedrine received The Danish Peace Fund Prize as an acknowledgment of her unyielding commitment to the cause of democracy and rule of a law in her home country and for her efforts to organize networks among human rights activist in the Arab world.

In 2011 she was awarded the Alison Des Forges Award by Human Rights Watch in recognition of her twenty years working to expose human rights violations under former Tunisian President Ben Ali. The award "celebrates the valor of individuals who put their lives on the line to protect the dignity and rights of others". She also won the IPI Free Media Pioneer Award.

Radio Kalima was among the 12 radio stations that were received the recommendation of the National Authority for the Information and Communication Reform (NAICR)to be given a license, but as of September were still awaiting the blessing of the interim government.

Since 2014, Ben Sidrine has headed the Truth and Dignity Commission in Tunisia, a constitutional commission tasked with hearing testimony from victims of state-sanctioned torture and corruption between 1955 and 2011. The commission held its first public hearing session on November 18.

Awards
The Ibn Rushd Prize for Freedom of Thought for the year 2011 in Berlin.

Late 1970s Bensedrine and other members of the Tunisian Human Rights League won collectively the Nobel Peace Prize in 2015.

See also
Tunisia Monitoring Group

References

External links
 
 Sihem Bensedrine  Freedom Collection interview

1950 births
Living people
People from Tunis Governorate
University of Toulouse alumni
Tunisian democracy activists
Tunisian human rights activists
Tunisian women journalists
20th-century Tunisian women writers
20th-century Tunisian writers
21st-century Tunisian women writers
21st-century Tunisian writers
Tunisian women